Myrsine africana, also called Cape myrtle, African boxwood or thakisa, is a species of shrub in the family Primulaceae. It is indigenous to Southern and Eastern Africa, the Azores, the Arabian Peninsula, South Asia and East Asia.

Description 
The fine-toothed leaves are at first deep red, but on maturity become glossy and dark green. The cream-coloured flowers appear in spring, with the male flowers boasting red anthers. Separate shrubs produce either male or female flowers, with the female plants also producing small purple berries. The foliage is dense, and dark-green to red in color. The hardy plant is long-lived.

M. africana sends up occasional shoots from its root system that go on to form new plants. It propagates easily from seed.

Uses 
Parts of the plant are used in milk and meat-based soups by the Batemi and Masai people of Africa, which is thought to reduce cholesterol levels in tribes that consume large amounts of meat. The flowers are also eaten.

Cape myrtle is increasingly popular for topiaries and small hedges, as it can so readily be pruned and shaped.

Gallery

References

 http://www.plantzafrica.com/plantklm/myrsinafr.htm

External links

africana
Flora of South Africa
Flora of Southern Africa
Flora of South Tropical Africa
Flora of East Tropical Africa
Flora of Northeast Tropical Africa
Flora of Asia
Flora of the Azores
Garden plants
Plants described in 1753
Taxa named by Carl Linnaeus